Bradley "Buzz" Calkins Jr. (born May 2, 1971 in Denver, Colorado) is a former Indy Racing League driver. After a successful run in Indy Lights from 1993 to 1995 where he finished 11th, 10th, and 6th in his three seasons, he and his Bradley Motorsports team purchased a 1995 Reynard chassis to compete in the inaugural season of the IRL. He won the series' inaugural race, the 1996 Indy 200 at Walt Disney World ahead of Tony Stewart and was that year's league co-champion with Scott Sharp.  He competed in the Indianapolis 500 six times, with a best finish of 10th in 1998. His win in the series' first race would end up to be his only IRL win. Calkins graduated from the University of Colorado Boulder in 1993. Calkins earned a Master of Business Administration from Kellogg School of Management at Northwestern University in 2000. He drove until 2001 when he retired and ventured into the business world. He served as president of his father's company, Bradley Petroleum, until its sale in 2017.

Motorsports career results

SCCA National Championship Runoffs

American open-wheel racing
(key) (Races in bold indicate pole position)

Indy Lights

Indy Racing League

Indianapolis 500

References

External links

1971 births
Living people
Racing drivers from Denver
IndyCar Series champions
IndyCar Series drivers
Indianapolis 500 drivers
Indy Lights drivers
Barber Pro Series drivers
SCCA National Championship Runoffs participants